Shwe Hpyin Nyidaw, also called Shwe Hpyin Nge or Min Lay, is one of the 37 nats in the official pantheon of Burmese nats. Together known as Shwe Hpyin Nyinaung (Brothers) or Taungbyon Min Nyinaung (Brother Lords), he and his brother Shwe Hpyin Naungdaw were sons of Byatta, the royal messenger, and Me Wunna, a flower-eating ogress from Mount Popa, during the reign of King Anawrahta of Bagan. They were killed for neglecting their duty to provide a brick each thus leaving gaps in Taungbyone Pagoda, which was built by King Anawrahta. They are portrayed on pedestals, one lying down and the other upright with his sword shouldered arrogantly. Me Wunna died of a broken heart after Byatta was killed and later their sons were taken away on the king's orders. She became a nat known as Popa Medaw (Mother of Popa).

Worshippers of this nat avoid consumption of pork, as Shwe Hpyin Gyi's father, Byatta, is believed to have been an Indian Muslim.

References

26